Ernest C. Hornsby also known as Sonny Hornsby (born October 8, 1936) was chief justice of the Supreme Court of Alabama from 1989 to 1995.

Biography
He was born on October 8, 1936, and he received his A.B. degree from Auburn University and his J.D. from the University of Alabama School of Law in 1960. From 1960 to 1988, He had a private law practice in Tallassee, Alabama. He served as a state senator for Tallapoosa County, Alabama and Elmore County, Alabama from 1962 to 1966. He served as president of the Elmore County Bar Association, president of the Alabama Trial Lawyers Association, and as Tallassee, Alabama City Judge from 1972 to 1978. From 1977 to 1978, he was president of the Alabama State Bar. He served as Chief Justice of the Supreme Court of Alabama from 1989 to 1995.

He was narrowly defeated for re-election in 1994 by Perry O. Hooper Sr., who became Alabama's third Republican chief justice and the first GOP member to hold the post in 120 years when Thomas Minott Peters (1872–1874) left office during Reconstruction.

References

1936 births
Living people
People from Tallassee, Alabama
Alabama state senators
Alabama state court judges
Chief Justices of the Supreme Court of Alabama
Auburn University alumni
University of Alabama School of Law alumni